Rice Memorial High School is a coeducational Roman Catholic secondary and college preparatory school in South Burlington, Vermont. It is located in the Roman Catholic Diocese of Burlington. The student body is mostly drawn from Northern and Central Vermont but includes other students including international students. The school and buildings were named for Bishop Joseph Rice who had established Cathedral High School in 1917.

History
Rice Memorial High School was opened on February 1, 1959 by Bishop Robert Joyce. Previous to this the school was known as Cathedral High School, which had been founded in 1917, and was located in Burlington, Vermont. Rice Memorial High School was built to replace the decaying building of Cathedral High School. On the day it became Rice Memorial High School, 900 students marched from the old Cathedral High School to the new high school. The school equally recognizes the graduates of both schools, Cathedral/Rice, as a "joint" alumni.

Boys' basketball had a 54-6 record from the fall season of 2007 through January 2009. Its only losses were to Burlington High School. Burlington's only loss since the 2007 season had been to Rice, in the 2009 State Championship They played Burlington High School in consecutive seasons, 2007–09, for the Vermont State Division I championship's, winning in 2007-09. From 2007-14, the boys' basketball team played in 7 out of 8 finals, winning 5 state titles.

In 2009, a fire caused damage to the gymnasium.

Academic
The school is accredited by the New England Association of Schools and Colleges.

Students
The student body has approximately 400 students, approximately 2/3 of whom are Catholic. 21 courses are offered in the Honors and Advanced Placement programs. In 2006, 64% of students scored 3 or higher on Advanced Placement exams. The average SAT score is 1799. 96% of students are accepted into four-year colleges.

Faculty
The average faculty member has 17 years experience, and 68% of the faculty have advanced degrees.

Principals
Msgr. Wendell Searles 
Rev. Roland Rivard 1975-1982
Rev. Ronald Soutiere 1982
Mr. John Lemon 1982
Mr. Phillip Soltau 1982-1984
Bro. John Collignon 1984-1994
Bro. Roger Lemoyne 1994-1998
Mr. John McCarthy 1998-2003
Dr. Alan Crowley (1976) 2003-2006
Msgr. Bernie Bourgeois 2006-2016
Sister Laura Della Santa 2016-2017
Lisa Lorenz 2017–2022
Dr. Andrew Keough 2022-Present

Athletics
About 80% of the students participate in interscholastic athletics. There are 32 athletic teams that compete in 17 different sports. The school's prime rival is cross-town Burlington High School. Rice Memorial's mascot is the Green Knight.

In 2022, both the girls basketball and boys basketball won the division 1 state championship.

Rice Memorial boys basketball has won 18 Vermont state championships, with their most recent championship being in 2022 where they won without any seniors on their roster.

Recognition
State Championships:

Division I Boys' Basketball 2020-2022
 Division II Boys' Golf (2014)
 Division I Boys' Ice Hockey (1994, 1995)
 Division I Girls' Soccer (1999)
 Division I Boys' Baseball 1964, 2014, 2015) 
 Division I Boys' Basketball (1968, 1970, 1971, 1980, 1985, 2000, 2007, 2009, 2011, 2013, 2014, 2015, 2020)
 Division I Girls' Basketball (1980, 1983, 1999, 2000, 2001, 2011, 2012)
 Division I Boys' Tennis (1984, 1987)
 Division I Girls' Tennis (1985, 1988, 2008)
 Division II Boys' Soccer (1994, 2001, 2014)
 Division II Girls' Track & Field (1994)
 Division II Girls' Soccer (1989, 1997, 2019, 2022)
 Division II Boys' Track (2003)
 Division II Football (1983, 1988, 1989, 2010, 2012, 2013, 2014)
 Division III Football (2004)
 Division II Boys' Lacrosse (2005, 2011, 2022)
 Division III Boys' Swimming (2007)
 Division I Scholar's Bowl (1984, 1986)
 Division II Field Hockey (2014)
 Division III Field Hockey (2008, 2009, 2010)
 Division II Girls' Lacrosse (2012, 2013)
 Division II Girls' Indoor Track (2014, 2015, 2016, 2017)
 Division II Boys' Indoor Track (2015)

Notable alumni
 Dan Chiasson (Class of 1989), author and poet
 Keith Cieplicki (Class of 1981), athlete and coach
 Johannah Leddy Donovan, (Class of 1962), member of the Vermont House of Representatives
 Michael Hastings (Class of 1998), journalist and author
 James P. Leddy (Class of 1960), Vermont state senator, 1997-2007
 Christina E. Nolan (Class of 1997), United States Attorney for Vermont
 Elizabeth M. Ready (Class of 1971), Vermont Auditor of Accounts, 2001-2005
 William Sorrell (Class of 1964), Vermont Attorney General, 1997-2017

References

Catholic secondary schools in Vermont
Educational institutions established in 1917
Schools in Chittenden County, Vermont
Roman Catholic Diocese of Burlington
Buildings and structures in South Burlington, Vermont
1917 establishments in Vermont